Eerstegoud is a village 14 km south-west of Polokwane. Laid out in 1868, it was first called Marabastad. At the request of the inhabitants the name was changed about 1954 to Eerstegoud, Afrikaans for 'first gold', in memory of the discovery in 1871 of the first gold in the Transvaal at Eersteling by Edward Button.

References

Populated places in the Polokwane Local Municipality
1868 establishments in the South African Republic